Abdelkader Messahel (born 11 July 1949) is a former Algerian journalist and Minister of Foreign Affairs of Algeria (2017–2019).

References

External links
 

1949 births
Living people
Foreign ministers of Algeria
Government ministers of Algeria
21st-century Algerian people